California Lawyer was a monthly legal magazine based in San Francisco, California.  The magazine was sent to every member of the State Bar.

History and profile
California Lawyer was launched in September 1981 by the State Bar of California as an updated version of the California State Bar Journal, published by the bar since 1926.

Prior to its launch, a prospectus for the magazine compared it to Business Week or Fortune for the California legal community. Edited by a staff of journalists and supported by advertising, California Lawyer offered legal news, as well as professional and general-interest articles.

But critics asserted the new magazine "virtually extinguished" attorney participation in bar publications, and despite its financial goals relied on mandatory annual membership dues for operating expenses.

In July 1987, the State Bar's board of governors, pressured by legislators to eliminate a budget deficit, voted to eliminate all funds for California Lawyer—effectively killing the magazine.

In October 1987 the State Bar reached agreement with Charles T. Munger, chairman of the Daily Journal Corp. and publisher of the Los Angeles Daily Journal.  The no-money sale committed Munger to include 12 pages of the State Bar's news and notices, to be written and edited by the bar, in each issue of California Lawyer. In April 1993 the bar's board of governors terminated the Daily Journal contract and voted to publish a tabloid newspaper for its members.

Once wholly independent, California Lawyer sought a wider audience for legal journalism, selling copies in bookstores and newsstands statewide. During this period, California Lawyer also produced two quarterly publications: House Counsel (1996-2002) and 8-K (2004-2006). In addition, beginning in 1996, the magazine staff recognized outstanding work by lawyers in a broad range of practice areas with annual California Lawyer Attorney of the Year (CLAY) awards.

Faced with declining revenue from display and classified advertising, the Daily Journal Corp. ceased publishing California Lawyer in September 2015. The callawyer.com website continues to publish articles online.

References

External links
 

Defunct magazines published in the United States
Legal magazines
Magazines established in 1981
Magazines disestablished in 2015
Magazines published in San Francisco
Monthly magazines published in the United States
Professional and trade magazines